VIP Brother 5, also referred to as VIP Brother 2013 was the fifth season of the reality show VIP Brother in Bulgaria and the eleventh season of the Big Brother format overall. It was confirmed by Nova Television on June 26, 2013 and commenced on September 15, 2013 and lasted for 63 Days, ended on November 16, 2013, holding the record for longest VIP season of the Big Brother format in Bulgaria together with the fourth season from 2012. Niki Kanchev and Aleksandra Sarchadjieva returned as main presenters. Stanka Zlateva won with Marian Kyurpanov as the runner-up.

Pre-season

Logo
As in VIP Brother 4 the logo from the most recent UK version of the format was used.

Housemates
9 Housemates entered the House on Day 1. They were joined by Paris Hilton and 8 other celebrities on Day 2.

Angel 
Angel Rashkov is a businessman and son of Roma boss Kiril Rashkov "Tsar Kiro" ("King Kiro"). He entered the House on Day 1 and walked on Day 5.

Anna 
Anna Yanova-Katur is a singer, wife of Jared and daughter of Mira. She entered the House on Day 2 and was the fourth evicted on Day 30.

Edelweiss 

Edelweiss is a Bulgarian pornographic actress of Russian descent. She entered the House on Day 2 and was the first evicted on Day 9.

Irina 
Irina Kostadinova "Florin" is a pop singer. She entered the House on Day 2 and was the eighth evicted on Day 58.

Ivaylo 
Ivaylo Stanchev is a constructor and boyfriend of Mira. He entered the House on Day 1 and was the second evicted on Day 16.

Jared 
Jared Katur is a musician and husband of Anna. He entered the House on Day 2 and was the third evicted on Day 23.

Lilyana 
Lilyana Popova "Liyana" is a pop-folk singer. She entered the House on Day 1 and finished fifth in the finale on Day 63.

Marian 
Marian Kyurpanov is a model. He entered the House on Day 1 and finished second in the finale on Day 63.

Mihail 

Mihail Mihaylov "Misho Shamara" ("Big Sha") is a rap singer. He entered the House on Day 1 and was the seventh evicted on Day 51.

Mira 
Mira Radeva is a sociologist. She entered the House on Day 1 with her boyfriend Ivaylo. Her daughter Anna and her son-in-law entered on Day 2. She was the ninth evicted on Day 58.

Pavel 

Pavel Chernev is an attorney and a politician. He entered the House on Day 1 and was the fifth evicted on Day 37.

Plamen 
Plamen Medarov is a businessman. He is a Housemate with a secret mission and is doing tricks as assigned by Big Brother. He entered the House on Day 1 and finished fourth in the finale on Day 63.

Stanka 

Stanka Zlateva is an Olympic medalist in wrestling. She entered the House on Day 1 and became a winner on Day 63.

Stoyko 

Stoyko Sakaliev is a professional footballer. He entered the House on Day 2 and was the tenth evicted on Day 60.

Tervel 

Tervel Pulev is a professional boxer. He entered the House on Day 2 and was the eleventh evicted on Day 60.

Vanya 
Vanya Chervenkova is a businesswoman. She entered the House on Day 2 and finished third in the finale on Day 63.

Yoana 
Yoana Zaharieva is a pop singer. She entered the House on Day 2 and was the sixth evicted on Day 44.

Houseguests

Paris 

On September 11 it was officially announced that Paris Hilton would enter the House. She landed on Sofia airport with a flight from Milan on September 16 and entered the House on Day 2 as a special Houseguest for a few days.

Zlatka D. 
Zlatka Dimitrova is a Playmate model in the Bulgarian version of Playboy Playmate and a former Housemate from VIP Brother 4. She entered the House on Day 37 and stayed on the end of the show, and was the first Housemate in the second season of Big Brother All Stars which commenced on November 18.

Zlatka R. 
Zlatka Raykova is a Playmate model in the Bulgarian version of Playboy Playmate. She entered the House on Day 46 and stayed on the end of the show, and was the second Housemate in Big Brother All Stars.

Nominations table

Notes 

 : The housemates were divided in two teams, with Stanka and Misho being the captain of each team. The team of Stanka won the competition, so she's the HoH of the week. Misho was automatically nominated as losing team captain.
 : Stanka could give immunity to two other housemates. She gave immunity to Vanya and Tervel.
 : Ivaylo and Mira, and Anna and Jared nominate together.
 : Plamen is immune as he is doing tricks for Big Brother. It is unknown to the other housemates, so they can still nominate him.
 : Jared is immune as he doesn't speak Bulgarian well.
 : During the eighth and final nominations, the housemates had to vote for out which they wanted to win (the names in ).

References

2013 Bulgarian television seasons
VIP Brother seasons
2013 Bulgarian television series endings